Vic-sous-Thil (literally Vic under Thil) is a commune in the Côte-d'Or département in eastern France.

Population

Sights
 Château de Thil, ruined mediaeval castle, listed since 1905 as a historic site by the French Ministry of Culture.

See also
Communes of the Côte-d'Or department
Parc naturel régional du Morvan

References

Communes of Côte-d'Or